Gill is an independent publisher and distributor based in Dublin, Ireland.

History
In 1856, Michael Henry Gill, printer for Dublin University, purchased the publishing and bookselling business of James McGlashan, and the company was renamed McGlashan & Gill. In 1875, it was renamed M.H. Gill & Son. In 1968, the company became associated with the London based Macmillan Publishers (founded 1843) and Gill & Macmillan was established. In 2013, the Gill family bought out Macmillan.

Products
Gill operates three distinct divisions - Gill Education, Gill Books and Gill Distribution.

Gill Education is a schools publisher. Gill Distribution provides warehousing and distribution facilities to a range of domestic and international publishers.

References

Publishing companies of the Republic of Ireland
Book publishing companies of Ireland
1856 establishments in Ireland